The Vengeance of Galora is a 1913 American silent drama film featuring Harry Carey.

Cast
 Claire McDowell - Galora
 Charles West - The Express Agent
 Nan Christy - The Express Agent's Fiancée
 Harry Carey - A Prospector
 John T. Dillon - The Sheriff
 Lionel Barrymore - (unconfirmed)
 Dorothy Gish - (unconfirmed)
 Blanche Sweet - (unconfirmed)
 Henry B. Walthall - (unconfirmed)

See also
Harry Carey filmography
Lionel Barrymore filmography
Blanche Sweet filmography

References

External links

1913 films
1913 drama films
1913 short films
American silent short films
American black-and-white films
Silent American drama films
Biograph Company films
Films directed by Anthony O'Sullivan
Films with screenplays by Lionel Barrymore
1910s American films
1910s English-language films
English-language drama films